Philip Mark Pelling KC (born 27 June 1956) is a British Specialist Chancery Senior Circuit judge.

He was educated at Bancroft's School and King's College London (LLB; AKC). He was called to the bar at Middle Temple in 1979, became a Queen's Counsel in 2003 and served as a Recorder from 2004 to 2006. He was made a bencher of Middle Temple in 2011.

References

1956 births
Living people
People educated at Bancroft's School
Alumni of King's College London
Associates of King's College London
21st-century King's Counsel
Circuit judges (England and Wales)